Goednes is a monotypic moth genus of the family Erebidae. Its only species, Goednes abnormalis, is found in Suriname. Both the genus and species were first described by William Schaus in 1916.

References

Herminiinae
Monotypic moth genera